The IM Marsh Campus is a former university campus in south Liverpool. It was, until 2021, home to the School of Education, Leisure and Sport Studies and the School of Teacher Education and Professional Learning (both part of the Faculty of Education, Health and Community (EHC)), of Liverpool John Moores University.

It formerly housed the majority of the University's sporting facilities including: sports hall, two gymnasiums, fitness suite, climbing wall, tennis courts, hockey astroturf and three large playing fields. All the facilities were operated by Marsh Sports.

History
The campus was founded in 1900 by Irene Mabel Marsh (hence the IM Marsh Campus) as a Physical Education Teacher Training college for Girls. Irene Marsh bought Barkhill House in 1919. The campus briefly became part of the University of Liverpool, until being transferred to Liverpool Polytechnic which later became Liverpool John Moores University.

Location
Based in the green suburb of Aigburth in south Liverpool approximately four miles from the city centre, it was the only LJMU campus outside of the city centre. It is well connected to the city and the rest of the United Kingdom through three local train stations (Aigburth Station, Mossley Hill Station and West Allerton Station), several bus routes operated by Merseytravel, and Liverpool John Lennon Airport.{
  "type": "FeatureCollection",
  "features": [
    {
      "type": "Feature",
      "properties": {},
      "geometry": {
        "type": "Polygon",
        "coordinates": [
          [
            [
              -2.9226851463317876,
              53.36878666426248
            ],
            [
              -2.919080257415772,
              53.37206410121381
            ],
            [
              -2.9188442230224614,
              53.371603226879465
            ],
            [
              -2.9183936119079594,
              53.369670060764456
            ],
            [
              -2.9182434082031254,
              53.369516427906134
            ],
            [
              -2.917943000793457,
              53.367916052685295
            ],
            [
              -2.9186511039733887,
              53.3678776429412
            ],
            [
              -2.919402122497559,
              53.36826173882363
            ],
            [
              -2.920432090759278,
              53.36753195368611
            ],
            [
              -2.9226851463317876,
              53.36878666426248
            ]
          ]
        ]
      }
    }
  ]
}

Former facilities

Learning Resource Centre
Computer Resource Centre
Science laboratories
Design and Technology laboratories
2 Gymnasiums
Climbing wall
Fitness Suite
Sports hall including 8 badminton courts, 2 basketball courts, five-a-side football pitches, Tennis Courts
Hockey pitch sized all weather AstroTurf
3 Outdoor Netball courts, Tennis Courts
Large Drama Studio
The Egg Dance studio
Sudley Dance studio

Notable former students
 Ian Usher (1982–1985 B.Ed (Outdoor Education) - traveller, adventurer, writer and speaker. Sold "entire life" on eBay in 2008.

2011 and on
On 30 March 2011, LJMU announced their intention to sell the campus and relocate the faculty to the city centre. This has had the foreseeable effect of rendering it as not as up to date as other LJMU campuses, as funding has not kept up with that of other campuses.

In 2022 the Bark Hill villa was saved from demolition after it was listed.

References

External links
Street map and aerial photo of IM Marsh from Multimap
Liverpool John Moores University website

Liverpool John Moores University
Physical education in the United Kingdom